The Seattle U Redhawks men's soccer program represents the Seattle University in all NCAA Division I men's college soccer competitions. Founded in 1967, the Redhawks compete in the Western Athletic Conference. The Redhawks are coached by Pete Fewing, who has coached the team for 25 years. Seattle U plays their home matches at Championship Field, on the campus of Seattle University.

Over the course of the program's history, the Redhawks have played at various levels of collegiate athletics. In 2004 they won the NCAA Div II National Championship. In 2013, Seattle joined as a full-member of the Western Athletic Conference. In their first season as a DI member, the Redhawks qualified for the NCAA Division I Men's Soccer Tournament, with their best performance coming in 2015, where they reached the Round of 16.

Seasons 
The following are Seattle University's records since joining the WAC in 2013.

Rivalries 

Washington — Washington Huskies are the crosstown-rival of the Redhawks. As of the conclusion of the 2019 season, Washington leads the series 45–8–5. The game is known as the Seattle Cup.
Portland — The Portland Pilots are the cascade rivals of the Redhawks. Since 2008, the Pilots lead the series 5–3–1. 
Gonzaga — The Gonzaga Bulldogs are rivals of the Redhawks. Since 2003, the Bulldogs lead the series 5-4.

Team honors

Conference championships 
Seattle U has won three WAC championships.

References

External links 
 

 
1967 establishments in Washington (state)
Association football clubs established in 1967